The Lasithi massacres were a series of massacres committed against ethnic Turkish and Cretan Muslim civilians in 1897. They occurred in the Lasithi region of eastern Crete. Between 850  and around 1,000 people were murdered, including women and children.

Background 

The Ottoman Empire had conquered Crete in the 17th century and as a consequence a large part of the local Christian population remained Christian. The central government of Ottomans also sent Turkish settlers to the island.  Following the Greek Revolution in 1821 there was continuing violence between the two religious communities. The Christians demanded the island's unification with Greece which the local Muslims opposed. Tensions remained high and in 1896 a violent conflict broke out which led to the landing of a Greek army on the island. Rumours of a massacre reached the Western consuls who ordered an investigation. However the first investigation was covered up, most of the investigators were local Christian Greeks. After some time a second investigation by British consul Alfred Biliotti confirmed the events.

Massacre 
The massacres took place during February 1897, when local Turkish and Muslim civilians were murdered by the local Greek people. At some places, Turkish civilians tried to defend themselves. A number of Muslims managed to escape. The surviving Muslims fled the areas, some 4,000 became refugees and very few returned to their homes again. Most of their lands and property had been taken over or destroyed by Greek Cretan Christians. According to the British consul Sir Alfred Biliotti, 851 people were killed - including 201 male and 173 female children, many of them raped before being killed .  Archaeologist Arthur Evans, who had been in Crete for some years, returned in 1898 as a reporter for the Manchester Guardian he wrote:

But the most deliberate act of extermination was that perpetrated at Eteà. In this small village, too, the Moslem inhabitants, including the women and children, had taken refuge in the mosque, which the men defended for a while. The building itself is a solid structure, but the door of the small walled enclosure... was finally blown in, and the defenders laid down their arms, understanding, it would appear, that their lives were to be spared. Men, women, and children, they were all led forth to the church of St. Sophia, which lies on a hill about half an hour above the village, and then and there dispatched—the men cut to pieces, the women and children shot. A young girl who had fainted, and was left for dead, alone lived to tell the tale.

Aftermath 
The conflict in the island continued. Local Muslims and Ottoman soldiers attacked the British troops stationed in Candia and massacred the local Christian population. After this event Ottoman troops were forced to leave the island and it was made an autonomous state under the supervision of the Great Powers. Alarmed by the events in Lasithi, Biliotti organized the evacuation of the local Muslims and Ottoman troops in Kandanos. They had been besieged by Greek rebels and they could suffer the same fate. Biliotti led an expedition and after the Turkish and Muslim civilians were robbed of their possessions by local Greek troops, they were allowed to be evacuated under escort of allied troops. Some time later Biliotti unsuccessfully tried to make an arrangement to restore the Muslims of Lasithi their lost property and land. After some time some with the influence of Greek authorities, British newspapers claimed that the massacres were false, Biliotti and Admiral Harris knew that they took place and replied to the newspapers.  The Cretan Turks and Muslims were forced to emigrate from the island in later years and in 1908 the island became unified with Greece.

List of victims according to Biliotti 
Sources:

References 

Ottoman Crete
Conflicts in 1897
Anti-Muslim violence in Europe
Massacres in Europe
Violence against Muslims
Lasithi
1897 in the Ottoman Empire
February 1897 events
Massacres of Muslims
Persecution of Ottoman Muslims